Caringbah railway station is located on the Cronulla line, serving the Sydney suburb of Caringbah. It is served by Sydney Trains T4 line services.

History
Caringbah station opened on 16 December 1939 when the Cronulla line opened from Sutherland to Cronulla. Caringbah was originally one of two stations on the single track, the other being Gymea.

On 15 July 1985, the line from Gymea to Caringbah was duplicated with a new track laid north of the existing single line.

In July 2001, an upgrade to the station was complete.

In April 2010, the rest of the line was duplicated.

Platforms & services

Transport links
Transdev NSW operates five routes via Caringbah station:
969: Sutherland station to Cronulla
971: Hurstville to South Cronulla
977: Westfield Miranda to Lilli Pilli
978: Westfield Miranda to Dolans Bay
988: Cronulla to Caringbah limited weekday service

Caringbah station is served by one NightRide route:
N11: Cronulla station to Town Hall station

References

External links

Caringbah Station details Transport for New South Wales

Easy Access railway stations in Sydney
Railway stations in Sydney
Railway stations in Australia opened in 1939
Cronulla railway line
Sutherland Shire